Methone may refer to:

 Methone (butterfly), a monotypic genus of metalmark butterflies
 Methone (moon), a small moon of Saturn, discovered in 2004
 Methone (Greek myth), one of the Alkyonides, daughters of the giant Alkyoneus
 Dimedone, an organic molecule

Geography
Methone (Argolis), a town in ancient Argolis, Greece 
Methone (Messenia), a town in ancient Messenia, Greece 
Methone (Thessaly), a town in ancient Thessaly, Greece 
Methoni, Messenia, a town in Messenia, Greece
Methoni, Pieria, a town in Pieria, Greece
Ancient Methone, ancient town and archaeological site

See also
Meton of Athens, an ancient Greek astronomer.
Metonic cycle, a 19 year cycle of lunar event